Chiffa is a town and gorge in the Tell Atlas Mountains of northern Algeria. This gorge is one of the few habitat areas in Algeria that supports a sub-population of the Barbary macaque, Macaca sylvanus.

References

External links

Populated places in Blida Province